Frequency is the tenth studio album by the British neo-progressive rock band IQ, released in May 2009 by Inside Out Music. Recorded at Aubitt Studios in Southampton and Redbridge Studios in Bolton from June 2007 to February 2009, it was produced by guitarist Michael Holmes. It was the first and only album recorded with new group members, keyboardist Mark Westworth and drummer Andy Edwards, as well as the last with bass guitarist John Jowitt.

Critical reception

In a three-and-a-half-star review, Alex Henderson of AllMusic has referred to Frequency as "a very moody" but at the same time "also very accessible" album, concluding that despite substantial line-up changes, "it illustrates IQ's ability to continue providing memorable and very digestible progressive rock 28 years after the band's formation".

Track listing

Personnel

IQ
 Peter Nicholls – lead vocals, backing vocals; photography
 Michael Holmes – guitars, keyboards; producer
 John Jowitt – bass guitar
 Mark Westworth – keyboards
 Andy Edwards – drums, percussion

Technical personnel
 Rob Aubrey – engineer
 Tony Lythgoe – design, artwork, photography
 Mark Hughes – photography
 Andy Labrow – photography
 Gill Whelan – photography
 Dene Wilby – band portraits

References

IQ (band) albums
2009 albums
Inside Out Music albums